The sixth and final season (also known as A Place to Call Home: The Final Chapter) of the Seven Network television series A Place to Call Home premiered on Showcase 19 August 2018. The series is produced by Chris Martin-Jones, and executive produced by Penny Win and Julie McGauran.

Production 
On 6 December 2017, Foxtel announced that A Place to Call Home had been renewed for a sixth season. It was later announced, on 19 March 2018 that the 10-episode sixth season would be the series' last.

Production on the sixth season began on 19 March 2018.

Of the show's return, Foxtel's Executive Director of Television, Brian Walsh stated, "Simply put, A Place to Call Home is one of the finest pieces of drama ever produced for Australian television. The series will be long remembered for its captivating narrative, outstanding performances and world class production values. Foxtel is proud to have been its home for the past four seasons and there is no doubt that it will be missed. A Place to Call Home was a series which was saved by its fans and so the journey of this, the final chapter, is a very important one. It was imperative for us that the series retain its integrity and that we would bring the series to a close at its natural story point and that is what everyone who loves the show can expect."

Foxtel's Head of Drama, Penny Win stated, "At Foxtel we have loved bringing this series to audiences and we know that it will be a beautiful closing chapter created by Bevan Lee, and the amazing cast and crew."

Seven's Head of Drama, Julie McGauran stated, "Seven Studios is once again delighted to partner with Foxtel to bring this stunning series to a defining and memorable ending."

The series' Script Executive, Bevan Lee stated "Season 6 truly completes my vision for the series. I promise to bring the show to its finale on a wave of tears, laughter and most importantly, closure."

Plot 
Season six takes place in 1959.

Cast

Main
 Marta Dusseldorp as Sarah Bligh
 Noni Hazelhurst as Elizabeth Goddard
 Brett Climo as George Bligh
 Craig Hall as Dr. Jack Duncan
 David Berry as James Bligh
 Abby Earl as Anna Bligh
 Arianwen Parkes-Lockwood as Olivia Bligh
 Sara Wiseman as Carolyn Duncan
 Tim Draxl as Dr. Henry Fox
 Deborah Kennedy as Doris Collins
 Dominic Allburn as Harry Polson
 Frankie J. Holden as Roy Briggs

Recurring & Guest
 Elliot Domoney as David Bligh
 Madeleine Clunies-Ross as Leah Gold
Conrad Coleby as Matthew Goddard
 Clodagh Crowe as Dawn Briggs

Episodes

Ratings

References

External links 
 
 

2018 Australian television seasons